Lac d'Aydat is a lake in Aydat, Puy-de-Dôme, France. At an elevation of 837 m, its surface area is 0.65 km². It is suggested by some historians that it is the site of Avitacum, the location of the villa belonging to the fifth-century senator and bishop Sidonius Apollinaris, as described in detail in one of his letters.

References 

Aydat
Aydat